Francis Joseph Rolleston (11 May 1873 – 8 September 1946) was a New Zealand politician of the Reform Party.

Early life

Rolleston was born in Christchurch in 1873, the son of the last Superintendent of the Canterbury Province, William Rolleston and his wife Mary Rolleston.  At the time of his birth, the family was living at Linwood House. His grandfather was Joseph Brittan (1805–1867), who was married to Sophia Brittan (died 1877).

From 1880 to 1884, the Rolleston family lived in Wellington.  William Rolleston held various ministerial posts in ministries led by John Hall (1879–1882), Frederick Whitaker (1882–1883) and Harry Atkinson (1883–1884) and their house in Molesworth Street, on the site that is these days occupied by Saint Paul's Cathedral, gave easy access to the Parliament Buildings.  With the defeat of the Atkinson Ministry, William Rolleston lost his ministerial income and due to the effects of the depression of the 1880s, the family moved to William Rolleston's  farm Kapunatiki at the south bank of the Rangitata River near its mouth in 1884.

Frank Rolleston was educated at Christ's College, where along with his older three brothers he was a boarder.  At one point, Frank Rolleston and the one year older Hector suffered the humiliation of having their school trousers lengthened by some ill-matching material.  Later, his older brother Lance (born 1869) was sent to England to finish his medical degree. Frank Rolleston, considered by his father the most able of his boys, was to go to Oxford University, but tight finances prevented this, and Lance Rolleston could only complete his degree with the financial help of his uncle Robert (his father's oldest brother). Instead, Frank Rolleston attended the University of Canterbury, from where he graduated with a BA and LLB.

On 3 March 1908, Rolleston married Mary Winifred Blair in Timaru.

Political career

Whilst he "put up an excellent fight" against William Hall-Jones, the incumbent Hall-Jones obtained 3479 votes versus 2432 votes for Rolleston.

He represented the Timaru electorate from 1922, when he defeated, with a majority of 282 votes, Percy Vinnell of the Labour Party. Rolleston and Vinnell contested the 1925 election, when Rolleston obtained a much increased majority of 2486 votes.  Rolleston lost the 1928 election against Rev Clyde Carr of the Labour Party, who would go on and represent the electorate until 1962.

Rolleston was a Cabinet minister, being the Minister of Defence, Minister of Justice and Attorney-General from 1926 to 1928 in the Reform Government of New Zealand.

His brother John was also elected to Parliament in 1922 (representing Waitomo) and was also defeated in 1928.

Frank Rolleston was Mayor of Timaru from 1921 to 1923.

Awards and death
Rolleston was awarded the King George V Silver Jubilee Medal in 1935, and the King George VI Coronation Medal in 1937.  He died on 8 September 1946 in Timaru.

Notes

References

Wedding photo (1908) of the Rollestons 

|-

|-

|-

|-

1873 births
1946 deaths
Members of the Cabinet of New Zealand
New Zealand defence ministers
Reform Party (New Zealand) MPs
Mayors of Timaru
University of Canterbury alumni
Commanders of the Order of the Star of Romania
Members of the New Zealand House of Representatives
New Zealand MPs for South Island electorates
Unsuccessful candidates in the 1905 New Zealand general election
Unsuccessful candidates in the 1928 New Zealand general election
People educated at Christ's College, Christchurch
Frank
20th-century New Zealand lawyers
Justice ministers of New Zealand
Brittan family